In the mathematical field of dynamical systems, a random dynamical system is a dynamical system in which the equations of motion have an element of randomness to them. Random dynamical systems are characterized by a state space S, a set of maps  from S into itself that can be thought of as the set of all possible equations of motion, and a probability distribution Q on the set  that represents the random choice of map. Motion in a random dynamical system can be informally thought of as a state  evolving according to a succession of maps randomly chosen according to the distribution Q.

An example of a random dynamical system is a stochastic differential equation; in this case the distribution Q is typically determined by noise terms. It consists of a base flow, the "noise", and a cocycle dynamical system on the "physical" phase space. Another example is discrete state random dynamical system; some elementary contradistinctions between Markov chain and random dynamical system descriptions of a stochastic dynamics are discussed.

Motivation 1: Solutions to a stochastic differential equation

Let  be a -dimensional vector field, and let . Suppose that the solution  to the stochastic differential equation

exists for all positive time and some (small) interval of negative time dependent upon , where  denotes a -dimensional Wiener process (Brownian motion). Implicitly, this statement uses the classical Wiener probability space

In this context, the Wiener process is the coordinate process.

Now define a flow map or (solution operator)  by

(whenever the right hand side is well-defined). Then  (or, more precisely, the pair ) is a (local, left-sided) random dynamical system. The process of generating a "flow" from the solution to a stochastic differential equation leads us to study suitably defined "flows" on their own. These "flows" are random dynamical systems.

Motivation 2: Connection to Markov Chain 
An i.i.d random dynamical system in the discrete space is described by a triplet .
  is the state space, .
Each such map has a  matrix representation, called deterministic transition matrix. It is a binary matrix but it has exactly one entry 1 in each row and 0s otherwise.
The discrete random dynamical system comes as follows,
 Independently of previous maps, another map  is chosen according to the probability measure   and the system moves to the state .
 The procedure repeats.
The random variable  is constructed by means of composition of independent random maps, .  Clearly,  is a Markov Chain.

Reversely, can, and how, a given MC be represented by the compositions of i.i.d. random transformations? Yes, it can, but not unique. The proof for existence is similar with Birkhoff–von Neumann theorem for doubly stochastic matrix.

Here is an example that illustrates the existence and non-uniqueness.

Example: If the state space  and the set of the transformations  expressed in terms of deterministic transition matrices. Then a Markov transition matrix can be represented by the following decomposition by the min-max algorithm, 

In the meantime, another decomposition could be

Formal definition

Formally, a random dynamical system consists of a base flow, the "noise", and a cocycle dynamical system on the "physical" phase space. In detail.

Let  be a probability space, the noise space. Define the base flow  as follows: for each "time" , let  be a measure-preserving measurable function:

Suppose also that
 for all , .

That is, forms a group of measure-preserving transformation of the noise . For one-sided random dynamical systems, one would consider only positive indices ; for discrete-time random dynamical systems, one would consider only integer-valued ; in these cases, the maps  would only form a commutative monoid instead of a group.

While true in most applications, it is not usually part of the formal definition of a random dynamical system to require that the measure-preserving dynamical system  is ergodic.

Now let  be a complete separable metric space, the phase space. Let  be a -measurable function such that

 for (almost) all ,  is continuous;
  satisfies the (crude) cocycle property: for almost all ,

In the case of random dynamical systems driven by a Wiener process , the base flow  would be given by

.

This can be read as saying that  "starts the noise at time  instead of time 0". Thus, the cocycle property can be read as saying that evolving the initial condition  with some noise  for  seconds and then through  seconds with the same noise (as started from the  seconds mark) gives the same result as evolving  through  seconds with that same noise.

Attractors for random dynamical systems
The notion of an attractor for a random dynamical system is not as straightforward to define as in the deterministic case. For technical reasons, it is necessary to "rewind time", as in the definition of a pullback attractor. Moreover, the attractor is dependent upon the realisation  of the noise.

See also
Chaos theory
Diffusion process
Stochastic control

References

Stochastic differential equations
Stochastic processes